The 1956 Western Kentucky Hilltoppers football team represented Western Kentucky State College (now known as Western Kentucky University) as a member of the Ohio Valley Conference (OVC) during the 1958 NCAA College Division football season. Led by Jack Clayton in his ninth and final year as head coach, the Hilltoppers compiled an overall record of 5–4 with a mark of 2–3 in conference play, tying for third place in the OVC. The team's captains were Jim Chambliss and Bill Strawn.

Schedule

References

Western Kentucky
Western Kentucky Hilltoppers football seasons
Western Kentucky Hilltoppers football